Fire It Up is an EP released by American rapper Kid Rock in 1993. The vinyl edition served as a single for his song "I Am the Bullgod", consisting of that song and "My Oedipus Complex" as a B-side, while the cassette and compact disc editions were extended plays with other songs.

Release
Fire It Up was released in December 1993, under the indie label Continuum Records. It appeared initially on cassette, compact disc, and on 7" vinyl. Following the success of Devil Without a Cause, Kid Rock purchased the rights to Fire It Up and licensed it to Atlantic Records. At the time of its release, Fire It Up didn't get much attention outside of the local Detroit area. However, it was nominated by the National Association of Independent Record Distributors for Best Heavy Metal Album in its Indie Awards in 1994. The album was not offered for sale when Kid Rock's catalog became available on iTunes.

Critical reception

Rolling Stone gave the EP 2 out of 5 stars.

Track listings

Personnel
Kid Rock – vocals, guitars, sequencing, bass, percussion
Bob Ebeling – drums
Andrew Nehra – guitar, bass, guiro, backing vocals
Michael Nehra – solo guitar on "I Am the Bullgod"
Chris Peters – guitar loop on "I Am the Bullgod"
Mike E. Clark – loop on "The Cramper"
Jon Slow – flute on "The Cramper"
Dave Seymour – background guitar licks on "A Country Boy Can Survive"
Prince Vince and Wes Chill – featured on "Rollin' On the Island"

References

Kid Rock albums
1993 debut EPs
Albums produced by Mike E. Clark
Continuum Records albums